Jose Panganiban, officially the Municipality of Jose Panganiban, is a 2nd class municipality in the province of Camarines Norte, Philippines. According to the 2020 census, it has a population of 63,662 people.

The municipality was formerly known as Mambulao, a word taken from “mambulawan,” meaning bountiful in gold. It was renamed to honor José María Panganiban on December 1, 1934.

Geography

Barangays
Jose Panganiban is politically subdivided into 27 barangays.

Climate

Climate in the Philippines is classified into four types. Camarines Norte's climate is classified under Type II, which is characterized by the absence of a dry season, with maximum rain period occurring between December to February, and minimum monthly rainfall occurring between March to May.

The northeast monsoon moves mainly north and northeast trending to easterly towards the end of the season. Average temperature ranges from 20 degrees Celsius to 28.3 degrees Celsius. Wind averages 15 to 20 miles per hour and is steadiest during January. The southeast monsoon is prevalent from June to September and is steadiest during the months of July and August, with wind speeds averaging from 10 to 15 miles per hour. The hottest months are from March to June, while the coolest months are from November to January.

Occurrences of rainfall in Jose Panganiban are more frequent during the predominance of the northeast monsoon between the months of October and May with maximum occurrence in November and December.

The highest rise in temperature occurs during the months of May and June, averaging between 28.9 degrees Celsius to 29 degrees Celsius. The coolest months are between December and February, with average ranging between 26.0 degrees Celsius to 26.4 degrees Celsius.

Relative humidity is the amount of water vapour present in the air. The municipality's normal relative humidity is at its highest and the steadiest between the months of September and December, while it is at its lowest between the months of April and June, the hottest months per year.

Demographics

Religions

Christian churches:
Ang Dating Daan
Assemblies of God
Body of Christ Bible Church
City Of Praise
Iglesia ni Cristo
Kingdom Hall of Jehovah's Witnesses
Seventh-day Adventist
The Church of Jesus Christ of Latter-day Saints

Roman Catholic churches:
Parish of Our Lady of the Most Holy Rosary
Parish of Saint Roch in Larap
The Feast Light Jose Panganiban, Camarines Norte

Economy

Mining
It is known that even before the colonizers came, Mambulao was already a flourishing mining town. It was the Spaniards, drawn by the rumor of immense gold deposits in the Mambulao-Paracale district, who mastered in exploring the gold mining potentials of these towns.

From the 1750s to 1800s, Paracale held the major Spanish mines, but due to its closure in the 1790s, its people were living in desultory gold washing, fishing and selling betel nut to Mambulao which has now become the mining center. During that time, there were plenty of small shops but there's no rice fields and vegetable gardening. All necessities came from Ambos Camarines and Tayabas (Quezon). Fifteen years later, the mines of Mambulao were no longer open. There was still some haphazard gold washing by women of Indio Class whose husbands, it was alleged, gambled away their meager earning in card games run by the town mayor. But by 1818,  the population was back to the levels of the 1790s and by the mid-1820s annual gold production levels ran as 3,200 ounces (90.7 kg.) worth Php. 44,000 at prevailing prices. By 1829, Camarines Norte was considered to be wealthy and populous enough to warrant separation as province of its own for the first time. But after the 1840s the mining and population declined. Dr. Fedor Jagor (in his book Travels in the Philippines and The former Philippines thru Foreign Eyes), a well known German traveler who visited Mambulao in 1859, reported that it was thinly populated and that the mining mania was already ruined. From 1837 to 1876 the population of Mambulao and Paracale decreased by 30%.

From 1900 until the early twenties, Mambulao was a sleepy town, isolated from the other towns of Camarines Norte. During the gold bloom, it was dubbed as “Little Manila”, due to flourishing business operated by Filipinos, Chinese, Japanese, Syrians and many others. Dutch-born Filipino citizen Jan Hendrik Marsman operated two rich mines during the American occupation, a substantial dredging operation and the Philippines only smelter located in the Mambulao- Paracale district. The population quadrupled between 1918 and 1938. One of the most notable mining company to operate in this municipality is the Philippine Iron Mines, then the largest iron mine in Asia.

Mining companies operating in Jose Panganiban include:
Philippine Iron Mines (defunct) 1925 to 1975, then biggest iron mine in Asia
San Mauricio Mining Company (defunct) 1933
Benguet Gold Mining Corporation (defunct) 
Motherlode Mining Company (defunct)
J. G. Realty and Mining Company (defunct) 1987-1997
Johson Gold Mining Corporation
Investwell Mining (mining arm of Isabelo Fonacier Mining)
Ferro Management and Consultancy Group Inc. (FMCGI) 2008

Jose Panganiban Special Economic Zones
JP-SEZ (1): Jose Panganiban SEZ, located in Barangay Osmeña, is a special economic zone created through Proclamation No. 1106 by former President Gloria Macapagal Arroyo on July 20, 2006. It consists of a total land area of three hundred sixty-one thousand seven hundred eleven (361,711) square meters and has its own private port registered at the Philippine Ports Authority. Magna-Kron Realty Philippines, Inc. is the current registered operator of the economic zone since 2018, succeeding Camnorte Ezone Realty, Inc. Magnakron Oleo Philippines, Inc. is a manufacturer of coconut-based ingredients and natural oil derivatives used for personal care (beauty and cosmetic products), consumer products, lubricants, fluids and oilfield, plastics, food and pharma, and, coatings, paints and inks. Primo Oleochemicals, Inc. and Pan Century Surfactants Inc. under the Aditya Birla Group formerly operated in the area. 
JP-SEZ (2): The second economic zone, located in Barangay Larap, was created under Proclamation No. 508 by former President Gloria Macapagal Arroyo on December 2, 2003. It is operated by the municipal government of Jose Panganiban under the name Global Industrial/Maritime Complex and has a total area of 30 hectares. In February 2018, the municipal government of Jose Panganiban made a lease contract agreement with Penson & Company, Inc. to develop the area as a model community and jewel of urban development in the Bicol region. The area, expanded to a total of 230 hectares, will house the Larap Integrated Development Project. The Larap Integrated Development Project will be divided into four (4) major components which include the Airport Zone, Aero Entertainment Park, Town Center, and Industrial Zone. The project site is 5 kilometers away from the town proper. The project cost is estimated at Two Billion Two Hundred Forty Four Million Pesos (Php 2,244,000,000.00). Resettlement issues such as loss of livelihood opportunities are the main concern about the project raised by the residents of Purok 7 of Barangay Larap. It is estimated that about 200 households will be affected by the project. The LGU of Jose Panganiban implemented a resettlement program to address the issue. The Larap Integrated Development Corporation (LIDC) has granted the LGU Php 20 Million for the resettlement of the affected households.

Tourism

Historical landmarks

Jose Maria Panganiban Monument - installed on February 1, 1985, by the National Historical Institute which contains the remains of the home-grown hero
Roy Padilla Sr. Monument - located inside Doña Ponay park, is a monument installed as a remembrance to Governor Casimero Ruiz Padilla, father of famous and political personalities in the Philippines today. Known for his excellent leadership skill, he was undefeated in all of his political campaigns. He was assassinated in Labo, Camarines Norte at the age of 61.

Islands and beach destinations

Parola Island - a popular island destination in Jose Panganiban famous for its pink sand shoreline, powdery beach, and clear blue water. The island got its name from a small light tower found in the island which guides fishermen at night. Tourists are advised to contact the Municipal Tourism Office when planning to visit the island.
Calalanay Island - This small island is a 30-minute boat ride from Larap Port. It is locally known for its white sand beach and clear blue water coming from the Philippine Sea. Tourists are advised to contact the Municipal Tourism Office when planning to visit the island.
Isla ni Cion - Aside from its long stretch of white sand beach, Isla ni Cion boasts of its mangrove eco-park which the locals proudly take care of. A bamboo walkway will lead tourists through this dense mangrove forest. Visitors can take a boat ride from Larap port to reach this area.
Pag-asa Beach - located in Barangay Pag-asa, this popular beach destination for locals is heavily visited during the months of March, April, and May. Small cottages and a public restroom are maintained by locals. 
Bulalacao Beach - a 30-minute travel, via motorcycle, tricycle, jeepney or your own vehicle, from the town proper, will get you to Bulalacao Beach in Barangay Luklukan Sur. The beach is named after meteor sightings by locals. Scenic views along the road will welcome tourists on their way to the beach. Bringing your own tent (tolda) or picnic table is advisable for groups visiting the area.

Other local spots
Fil-Nippon Fountain of Friendship Park - located in Barangay North Poblacion, Fil-Nippon Fountain of Friendship Park (or simply known as Fountain) is a park built as a symbol of friendship between Filipinos and Japanese and as a remembrance of the town's rich history with the Japanese during the time of Philippine Iron Mines.
Doña Ponay Park - located in Barangay South Poblacion, Doña Ponay park is built as a remembrance to Doña Apolinaria de los Reyes, popularly known as Doña Ponay, a former resident of Monte Calogcog (now known as Barangay Luklukan Norte). Her most popular story was her gift to Queen Isabella of Spain; a life-size hen with 12 chicks standing on a platter made of solid gold.
Mambulao Boardwalk - located in Barangay North Poblacion, adjacent to Fil-Nippon Fountain of Friendship Park, Mambulao Boardwalk is a popular spot for locals to see the sun setting over Mambulao Bay.
Turayog Resort - located in Barangay Luklukan Norte, Turayog Resort is increasingly becoming popular among tourists and locals with its viewing deck which gives a 360-degree view of the town of Jose Panganiban.

Infrastructure

Airport and Seaports

The Larap (Jose Panganiban) Airport (ICAO Code: RPUP), formerly operated by the Philippine Iron Mines, covers an area of approximately 35 hectares and with existing 1,400 meter stretched runway. It is located at Latitude 14°17′28″N Longitude 122°38′46″E.

In January 2018, mobilization for the construction of Larap Regional Airport immediately began after the ceremonial groundbreaking of Larap Integrated Development Project. Penson and Company, Inc., who will build and operate the airport, expects to rehabilitate the existing 1400 meter runway by 2018 then upgrade its length to 1900–2000 meters by 2019. The airport is expected to operate commercially by 2021.
The nearest commercial airports that operate regularly are Naga Airport (126 km away) in Pili, Camarines Sur and Bicol International Airport (216 km away) in Albay.

The International Port of Jose Panganiban (Latitude 14° 17’N Longitude 122° 42’E) is nearly 2 miles wide at the entrance between Calambayungan Island and Pinandungan Point and with sea distance to Manila of 468.10 nautical miles.The port is situated at Barangay Osmeña which is approximately five (5) kilometers away from the town proper of Jose Panganiban. The port serves as the passage of all water borne traffic to and from the Paracale mining area, Larap., Lucena, other Quezon town and the rest of Bicol and Visayas provinces. Copra, coconut oil and copra pellets used to be its principal exports.

The Port of Larap Bay is a natural coastal harbor situated at Barangay Larap (Latitude 14° 18' 36" N Latutude 122° 39' 0" E), currently serving the needs of a local mining company. The harbor entrance is restricted due to swell.

The Private Port of Jose Panganiban SEZ is located inside Magnakron Oleo Philippines, Inc. It is registered at the Philippines Ports Authority with registration type P/NC and is being operated by Magnakron Realty Philippines, Inc.

Public Land Transportation
The municipal's public transportation needs are provided by Tricycles, Jeepneys (Route: Downtown to Mountainous Villages), Vans (Route: Jose Panganiban to Daet), and Buses (Routes: Jose Panganiban to Daet via Labo, Jose Panganiban to Tabaco, Albay via Naga City, and Jose Panganiban to Metro Manila). Philtranco, Superlines, and Elavil serve the Jose Panganiban/Paracale-Metro Manila route.

Electricity and Water Supply
Jose Panganiban is being served by the National Power Corporation through CANORECO (Camarines Norte Electric Cooperative). A Coal Power Plant is set to be built by H and WB Asia Pacific Pte. Ltd. by 4th quarter of 2017 which is expected to generate a total of 700 Megawatts of power supply by 2025.

Water supply and treatment is provided by Jose Panganiban Water District, a local cooperative. The water system of Jose Panganiban Water District (JPWD) includes surface water and groundwater (through wells) as water source. It also consists of treatment facilities, pumping facilities, reservoir, pipelines and service connections. It was constructed in 1953 with the concrete intake structure (Paltic Dam) along Paltic Creek, a reservoir, pipelines and service connections as its original facilities. A series of rehabilitation projects had been implemented in Jose Panganiban consisting of source development (well drilling and construction of surface water source), provision of electromechanical facilities, pipeline extension to adjacent barangays and installation of additional service connections.

Communication
Mambulao Cable Television and JP Cable TV System provide digital cable services and fixed-line internet connection throughout the municipality. Smart Communications, Globe Telecom, and Sun Cellular are the mobile, fixed-line, broadband, 3G and 4G internet Service provider. International Calls are provided by the Local Government for free. Town FM 89.3 also broadcasts from the municipality.

Medical Institutions
Jose Panganiban Rural Health Unit 1 - Barangay South Poblacion (East District)
Jose Panganiban Rural Health Unit 2 - Barangay Larap (West District)
Jose Panganiban Primary Hospital Services Coop. - Barangay North Poblacion
Barrios-Busiños Medical Clinic and Hospital - Barangay Santa Rosa Norte

Education

Post-secondary
Camarines Norte State College - Jose Panganiban Campus (College of Engineering and Industrial Technology) formerly Camarines Norte School of Arts and Trades
Roy Padilla Sr. (JP) Memorial Technical and Vocational Training Center (TESDA-accredited)

Public Secondary 
Jose Panganiban National High School
Larap National High School
Santa Cruz National High School
Gawad Kalinga High School

Public Primary 

West District:
Larap Elementary School
C.B. Enverga (Santa Cruz) Elementary School
Tawig (Salvacion) Elementary School
D. Albonia (Tamisan) Elementary School
Pagasa Elementary School
L.D. Bamba (Dayhagan) Elementary School
Sta Elena Elementary School
San Isidro Elementary School
San Jose Elementary School 
San Pedro Elementary School 
San Martin Elementary School
Sta Milagrosa Elementary School
Dahican Elementary School
Nakalaya Elementary School
V. Gabo Elementary School
Ulipanan Elementary School

East District:
Jose Panganiban Elementary School
San Mauricio (Bagong Bayan) Elementary School
San Rafael Elementary School
Santa Rosa Norte Elementary School
Parang Elementary School
Regino A. Yet (Luklukan Sur) Elementary School
Osmena (Lukban) Elementary School
Calero Elementary School
Calogcog Elementary School
San Rafael Elementary School
Segundo Aguirre (Santa Rosa Norte) Elementary School
Roman V. Heraldo Elementary School(Santa Rosa Sur )

Private Schools 
Listed below are private schools currently included in the Department of Education's Masterlist.

Nonsectarian Schools
 Montessori de Mambulao Learning Centre (Pre-elementary) - Plaridel
 Wonderkids Science Montessori School (Pre-elementary) - South Poblacion

Sectarian Schools
 Ananda Marga Special Academic Institution (Pre-elementary and Elementary) - San Rafael
 Ave Maria Children's Center (Pre-elementary) - North Poblacion
 Good Shepherd Christian Learning (Pre-elementary)-Plaridel
 St. Roch Children's Center (Pre-elementary) - Larap

Media

Radio stations
Hot FM 94.3 - Jose Panganiban (No Longer in Broadcast)
Town FM 89.3 - Jose Panganiban (No Longer in Broadcast)

Sister cities
 Makati
 Valenzuela City

Gallery

See also
List of renamed cities and municipalities in the Philippines

References 
Philippine Standard Geographic Code
Jose Panganiban Elementary School

External links

Jose Panganiban Official Website
Jose Panganiban Website
 [ Philippine Standard Geographic Code]
Mambulaoans Worldwide Buzz

Municipalities of Camarines Norte
Mining communities in the Philippines